General Tso's chicken is a sweet and spicy deep-fried chicken dish that is served in North American Chinese restaurants. The dish is named after Zuo Zongtang, formerly romanized "Tso Tsung-t'ang", a Qing dynasty statesman and military leader, although the dish has no recorded connection to Zuo nor is the dish known in Zuo's home province, Hunan.

Name and origins
The dish has been associated with Zuo Zongtang (Tso Tsung-t'ang) (1812–1885), a Qing dynasty statesman and military leader from Hunan Province, but Zuo could not have eaten the dish or known of it. The dish is found neither in Changsha, the capital of Hunan Province, nor in Xiangyin County, where Zuo was born. Moreover, Zuo's descendants, who are still living in Xiangyin County, when interviewed, said that they had never heard of such a dish.

There are several stories concerning the origin of the dish. Eileen Yin-Fei Lo states in her book The Chinese Kitchen that the dish originates from a simple Hunan chicken dish and that the reference to "Zongtang" was not a reference to Zuo Zongtang's given name, but rather a reference to the homonym "zongtang (宗堂)", meaning "ancestral meeting hall". Consistent with this interpretation, the dish name is sometimes (but considerably less commonly) found in Chinese as 左宗棠雞 (Chung tong gai is transliterated from Jyutping; Zuǒ Zōngtáng jī is transliterated from Hanyu Pinyin).

The dish or its variants are known by a number of variant names, including:

Peng Chang-kuei claim
Fuchsia Dunlop argues that the recipe was invented by Taiwan-based Hunan cuisine chef Peng Chang-kuei,  who had been an apprentice of Cao Jingchen, a leading early 20th-century Chinese chef. Peng was the Nationalist government's banquet chef and fled with Kuomintang forces to Taiwan during the Chinese Civil War. There he continued his career as official chef until 1973, when he moved to New York to open a restaurant. One new dish, General Tso's chicken, was originally prepared without sugar and subsequently altered to suit the tastes of "non-Hunanese people". The popularity of the dish has led to it being adopted by local Hunanese chefs and food writers. When Peng opened a restaurant in Hunan in the 1990s introducing General Tso's chicken, the restaurant closed without success, as the locals found the dish too sweet.

Peng's Restaurant on East 44th Street in New York City claims that it was the first restaurant in the city to serve General Tso's chicken. Since the dish (and cuisine) was new, Peng made it the house specialty in spite of the dish's commonplace ingredients. A review of Peng's in 1977 mentions that their "General Tso's chicken was a stir-fried masterpiece, sizzling hot both in flavor and temperature".

Peng died from pneumonia in November 2016 at 98 years old.

Wang claim
New York's Shun Lee Palaces, located at East (155 E. 55th St.) and West (43 W. 65th St.), also claims that it was the first restaurant to serve General Tso's chicken and that it was invented by a Chinese immigrant chef named T. T. Wang in 1972. Michael Tong, owner of New York's Shun Lee Palaces, says "We opened the first Hunanese restaurant in the whole country, and the four dishes we offered you will see on the menu of practically every Hunanese restaurant in America today. They all copied from us."

It has also been argued that the two stories can be somewhat reconciled in that the current General Tso's chicken recipe — where the meat is crispy fried — was introduced by Chef Wang but as "General Ching's chicken", a name which still has trace appearances on menus on the Internet (the identity of its namesake "General Ching" is, however, unclear); whereas the name "General Tso's chicken" can be traced to Chef Peng, who cooked it in a different way.

These competing claims are discussed in the 2014 documentary film The Search for General Tso, which also traces how the history of Chinese immigration into the US parallels the development of a unique Chinese-American or American Chinese cuisine.

Recipes

Traditional basic ingredients include:

 Sauce: soy sauce, rice wine, rice-wine vinegar, sugar, cornstarch, dried red chili peppers (whole), garlic.
 Batter / breading: egg, cornstarch.
 Dish: broccoli, chicken dark meat (cubed).

Regional differences
The Taiwanese restaurant Peng Chang-kuei also serves the dish and is credited by some sources as the inventor of the dish. Differences between this Taiwanese dish and that commonly encountered in North America are that it is not sweet in flavor, the chicken is cooked with its skin and that soy sauce plays a much more prominent role.

See also 

 American Chinese cuisine
 Canadian Chinese cuisine
 List of Taiwanese inventions and discoveries
 Crispy fried chicken
 Lemon chicken
 List of chicken dishes
 Orange chicken
 Sesame chicken

Notes

References and further reading

 " 7 Chefs on the Enduring Appeal of General Tso's Chicken," Grub Street  (January 8, 2015).
 https://www.mashed.com/228943/the-little-known-reason-you-shouldnt-order-general-tsos-chicken-at-a-chinese-restaurant/
 https://www.youtube.com/watch?v=yvvN_FnVxx0

External links

American Chinese chicken dishes
American inventions
Canadian Chinese chicken dishes
Deep fried foods